Jack Scrimshaw (born 4 September 1998) is a professional Australian rules footballer playing for the Hawthorn Football Club in the Australian Football League (AFL).

Early career

Jack Scrimshaw as a junior played football with the Beaumaris Football Club and the Sandringham Dragons. Talent scouts liked the dash and the plenty of X-Factor he displayed as a versatile and accurate left-footer. At 193 centimetres he had the height to demand attention.  Scrimshaw played on the wing during the TAC championships and while he can move forward he looked most at home in defence.

AFL career

He was drafted by Gold Coast with their second selection and seventh overall in the 2016 national draft.

Scrimshaw was unable to break into the Gold Coast senior side after the departure of coach, Rodney Eade and list manager Scott Clayton and several other coaches and support staff. Scrimshaw averaged 23 disposals in the NEAFL 2018 season. During that time he suffered a broken cheekbone and later had concussion. At the end of the 2018 season Scrimshaw requested a trade to a Victorian-based club.

Scrimshaw changed his guernsey number from 35 to 14 before the 2020 season.

Statistics
Updated to the end of the 2022 season.

|-
| 2017 ||  || 37
| 4 || 0|| 0|| 25 || 15 || 40 || 16 || 3 || 0 || 0 || 6.3 || 3.8 || 10.0 || 4.0|| 0.8 || 0
|-
| 2018 ||  || 2
| 0 || — || — || — || — || — || — || — || — || — || — || — || — || — || — || 0
|-
| 2019 ||  || 35
| 10 || 0 || 1 || 86 || 74 || 160 || 41 || 18 || 0.0 || 0.1 || 8.6 || 7.4 || 16.0 || 4.1 || 1.8 || 0
|-
| 2020 ||  || 14
| 13 || 0 || 0 || 121 || 82 || 203 || 51 || 23 || 0.0 || 0.0 || 9.3 || 6.3 || 15.6 || 3.9 || 1.8 || 0
|-
| 2021 ||  || 14
| 20 || 4 || 2 || 249 || 163 || 412 || 127 || 29 || 0.2 || 0.1 || 12.5 || 8.2 || 20.6 || 6.4 || 1.5 || 1
|-
| 2022 ||  || 14
| 20 || 3 || 3 || 233 || 147 || 380 || 115 || 25 || 0.2 || 0.2 || 11.7 || 7.4 || 19.0 || 5.8 || 1.3 || 0
|- class="sortbottom"
! colspan=3| Career
! 67 !! 7 !! 6 !! 714 !! 481 !! 1195 !! 350 !! 98 !! 0.1 !! 0.1 !! 10.7 !! 7.2 !! 17.8 !! 5.2 !! 1.5 !! 1
|}

Notes

Honours and achievements
Team
 TAC Cup premiership (Sandringham Dragons): 2016

Individual
  most improved player: 2020

External links

References

1998 births
Living people
People educated at Haileybury (Melbourne)
Box Hill Football Club players
Hawthorn Football Club players
Gold Coast Football Club players
Sandringham Dragons players
Australian rules footballers from Victoria (Australia)